Ceratoichthys pinnatiformis is an extinct species of lookdown-like prehistoric jackfish that lived during the Lutetian epoch, of the Middle Eocene of Monte Bolca, Italy.

The dorsal and anal fins of C. pinnatiformis had very high, narrow crests, and it also had very long, thin pelvic fins.  Its fins give it a superficial resemblance to a freshwater angelfish, leading some people to erroneously refer to C. pinnatiformis as an "angelfish," too.

See also

 Prehistoric fish
 List of prehistoric bony fish

References

Carangidae
Eocene fish
Fossils of Italy